This is a bibliography of literature treating the topic of criticism of Mormonism (also known as the Latter Day Saint movement (LDS)), sorted by alphabetical order of titles.

In September 1993, six LDS Church members known as the "September Six" were excommunicated or disfellowshipped by the church, allegedly for publishing scholarly work against or criticising church doctrine or leadership.

Books by title 
 Black and Mormon (2004) edited by Newell G. Bringhurst and Darron T. Smith
 The Challenge of the Cults and New Religions (2001), a general Christian countercult book with a chapter on Mormonism by Ron Rhodes
 An Insider's View of Mormon Origins (2002) by Grant H. Palmer, who was disfellowshipped for its publication in 2004
 Joseph Smith and the Origins of the Book of Mormon (1985, 2000) by David Persuitte
 The Kingdom of the Cults (1965), a general Christian countercult book with a chapter on Mormonism by Walter Ralston Martin
 Latter-day Dissent: At the Crossroads of Intellectual Inquiry and Ecclesiastical Authority (2011) by Philip Lindholm
 "The LDS Intellectual Community and Church Leadership: A Contemporary Chronology" in Dialogue: A Journal of Mormon Thought (1993) by Lavina Fielding Anderson, which led to her excommunication as one of the September Six
 The Mormon Prophet and His Harem (1866), a biography of Brigham Young by Catharine Van Valkenburg Waite
 Mormonism Unvailed (1834) by Eber D. Howe
 Mormonism: Shadow or Reality? (1963) by Jerald and Sandra Tanner
 No Man Knows My History: The Life of Joseph Smith (1945) by Fawn M. Brodie
 The Rocky Mountain Saints: A Full and Complete History of the Mormons (1873) by T. B. H. Stenhouse
 Secret Ceremonies: A Mormon Woman's Intimate Diary of Marriage and Beyond (1993) by Deborah Laake
 Under the Banner of Heaven: A Story of Violent Faith (2003) by Jon Krakauer
 Utah and the Mormons (1854) by Benjamin G. Ferris
 Wife No. 19 (1876) by Ann Eliza Young, one of the wives of Brigham Young
 Women and Authority: Re-emerging Mormon Feminism (1992) by Lavina Fielding Anderson and D. Michael Quinn (September Six)

See also 
 Bibliography of books critical of Christianity
 Bibliography of books critical of Islam
 Bibliography of books critical of Judaism
 Bibliography of books critical of Scientology
 List of apologetic works
 List of Christian apologetic works
 List of Islamic apologetic works

References 

Mormonism-related controversies
 
Bibliographies of subcultures
Criticism of Mormonism
Lists of books about religion